Sam Evans is a Welsh television personality and former stock assistant from Llanelli, Carmarthenshire. He is best known for winning the fourteenth series of the British reality television show, Big Brother in 2013.

He was born with 70-80% hearing loss.

TV appearances

Deal or No Deal
In 2012, Evans appeared on the game show Deal or No Deal, where he won £7,000 and a week's holiday for two in Egypt.

Big Brother UK

In 2013, Evans competed in the UK's fourteenth series of Big Brother, entering the house on Day 1.

On Day 68, Evans was crowned the winner of the series. After his victory, he announced that he intended to return to working in Debenhams.

Cariad@iaith
In June 2014 Evans took part in the S4C Welsh learners television series Cariad@iaith:love4language, learning to speak the language with other Welsh celebrities at a language centre in Gwynedd.

References

People from Llanelli
Living people
Year of birth missing (living people)
Welsh television personalities
Big Brother (British TV series) winners